Weaversdown Halt railway station is a former railway station, on the Longmoor Military Railway, which served the eastern side of Longmoor Military Camp. The station did not appear on Ordnance Survey mapping throughout its life and did not have signs on the platform, it was variously known as Weaversdown, Weavers Down and Weaver Down sometimes with the additional Junction and sometimes with Halt.

It is situated to the North of a branch curving away to the East and consisted initially of a passing loop with one platform built from sleepers being added later, there was a shelter and a block post, the Army's name for a signal box.

The station was closed along with the rest of the line on 31 October 1969.



References

Citations

Bibliography

Further reading
 
 

Disused railway stations in Hampshire
Former Longmoor Military Railway stations